Zănoaga may refer to several villages in Romania:

 Zănoaga, a village in Leu Commune, Dolj County
 Zănoaga, a village in Dăneasa Commune, Olt County
 Zănoaga, a village in Dumbrava Commune, Prahova County